The following highways are numbered 454:

Japan
 Japan National Route 454

United States
  Louisiana Highway 454
  Maryland Route 454
  Mississippi Highway 454
  Montana Secondary Highway 454
  New York State Route 454
  Oregon Route 454
  Pennsylvania Route 454 (former)
  Puerto Rico Highway 454
  Farm to Market Road 454